Björn Bryan Hardley (born 19 December 2002) is a Dutch footballer who plays as a defender for Manchester United.

Early life
Born in Tilburg, Hardley started his career with local sides SV Advendo and RKVV DIA, before joining NAC Breda in 2014. While at NAC, Hardley's performances caught the eye of Manchester United scout Rene Moonen, who invited four other United scouts to watch Hardley in action.

Club career
After impressing scouts, Hardley signed a three-year contract with Manchester United in 2019. He progressed through the ranks at United, establishing himself in the under-18 squad before moving to the under-23 side. He made three appearances in the 2021–22 EFL Trophy, scoring once in a 3–2 defeat to Lincoln City.

Having trained with the first team since November 2021, Hardley was added to Manchester United's Champions League squad in early December.

International career
Hardley is eligible to represent the Netherlands and Suriname.

Career statistics

Club

References

2002 births
Living people
Footballers from Tilburg
Dutch footballers
Dutch sportspeople of Surinamese descent
Association football defenders
NAC Breda players
Manchester United F.C. players
Dutch expatriate footballers
Dutch expatriate sportspeople in England
Expatriate footballers in England